Dufour or variant, may refer to:
Dufour (surname)

Places
Dufourspitze or Dufour's peak, in the Swiss Alps
Julia Dufour, a village and municipality in Santa Cruz Province, Argentina

Other uses
1961 Dufour, main-belt asteroid 
Dufour Auditorium, a concert hall in Saguenay, Quebec, Canada
Dufour Yachts, French sailboat manufacturer 
Dufour's gland, an abdominal gland of certain insects
Dufour effect, the energy flux due to a mass concentration gradient

See also
Dufour-Lapointe, a surname
Four (disambiguation)
Joseph Dufour et Cie, French wallpaper and fabrics manufacturer
DE 4, Delaware Route 4
(23466) 1990 DU4, asteroid
DU-4, an acupuncture point